Altmore (from , meaning "great glen")) is a hamlet and townland in County Tyrone, Northern Ireland. It is five miles from Carrickmore and four miles from Pomeroy. The townland is actually called Altmore (alias Barracktown) and is situated in the historic barony of Dungannon Middle and the civil parish of Pomeroy and covers an area of 1117 acres.

Population
Most of the community consists of farmers who make their livelihood in cattle and pig farming.

The population of the townland declined during the nineteenth century:

Places of interest

The townland contains two Scheduled Historic Monuments: a Megalith (grid ref: H6710 6936) and a court tomb (grid ref: H6686 6961)

Other places of interest include:
 The Mountains of Pomeroy are a dominating feature in the landscape. Ancient relics can be seen on country lanes. Their origin is unknown though they may be ancient burial grounds dating back as far as three thousand years. These can be seen at various stages on roadways along Altmore. Though modern farming methods have diminished a number of them visibly a few can still be seen.
 Altmore Fisheries is a small holiday site with static caravans and areas to erect tents; there are also log cabins which can be rented and a small shop on site.
 Altmore House was built after 1734 by Patrick Shields.  He married Susannah Morris the daughter of the High Sheriff of Tyrone. He had been appointed keeper of a deserted barracks higher up the mountain. That premises was converted into Barracktown House also a Shields family home. The family lived permanently in the house until the 1970s when it was sold and turned into a hotel. The hotel was blown up during the troubles on two occasions and after many years of dormancy the ruins were eventually knocked down. The house was the birthplace of James Shields who became a politician in North America (being the only person to have served as a United States Senator from three different states) and a well-known name during the American Civil War.
Shane Bernagh’s Chair is a small rocky area on the outskirts of Cappagh and Altmore. It received its fame from local highwayman Shane Bernagh, who used the mountain area as a vantage point to hold up carriages travelling on the main Dublin to Derry road nearby.  Local legend has it that the highwayman assisted impoverished locals with his robberies, which primarily targeted members of the Protestant Ascendancy. A barracks was built in the Altmore area in an attempt to curb his activities but to little avail. Because of this Bernagh has over time become a local legend in the mould of Robin Hood who robbed from the rich and gave to the poor. He was eventually captured and executed by the Dublin Castle administration, and his body was cast into a lough at the summit of Slieve Beagh, which straddles the counties of Tyrone, Fermanagh and Monaghan. He was immortalised further by the local scholar Dr. George Sigerson in his popular ballad "The Mountains of Pomeroy". The actual rocky area looks like a chair and has thus become known as Shane Bernagh’s Chair.

See also
List of townlands of County Tyrone
List of archaeological sites in County Tyrone

References

Villages in County Tyrone
Archaeological sites in County Tyrone
Townlands of County Tyrone
Barony of Dungannon Middle